Soviet invasion of Poland can refer to:
 the second phase of the Polish-Soviet War in 1920 when Soviet armies marched on Warsaw, Poland
 Soviet invasion of Poland (1939) when Soviet Union allied with Nazi Germany attacked Second Polish Republic